Johny Schleck (born 22 November 1942) is a former professional cyclist from Luxembourg.

Professional life 
Between 1965 and 1974 Schleck was a professional cyclist. He participated in the Tour de France eight times (1965-1968 and 1970-1973). From 1965 until 1968, he rode in the Pelforth - Sauvage - Lejeune team, and in the Bic-team from 1969 until the end of his career.

Johny rode the Tour de France at the service of 1968 winner Jan Janssen and 1973 winner Luis Ocaña, and also managed to finish in the top 20 of the general classification twice: 19th in 1970 and 20th in 1967. He won a stage in the 1970 Vuelta a España and the Luxembourg National Championships. Johnny's father, Auguste Schleck, also contested events in the 1920s. He also competed in the individual road race at the 1964 Summer Olympics.

Personal life 
Schleck is married and has three sons, two of whom were professional cyclists: Fränk (born 1980) and Andy (born 1985).

References

External links
 

1942 births
Living people
Luxembourgian male cyclists
People from Remich (canton)
Olympic cyclists of Luxembourg
Luxembourgian Vuelta a España stage winners
Cyclists at the 1964 Summer Olympics